The Pittsburg Public Library is a public library in Pittsburg, Kansas, United States.  A part of the Southeast Kansas Library System, it circulates a collection of over 70,000 items.  Its Prairie Style building was built in 1910 through a donation from Andrew Carnegie.  Today, the building is listed on the National Register of Historic Places.

Gallery

See also
Center for the Assessment and Remediation of Reading Difficulties
National Register of Historic Places listings in Crawford County, Kansas

References

External links

Library website

Library buildings completed in 1910
Carnegie libraries in Kansas
Libraries on the National Register of Historic Places in Kansas
Buildings and structures in Pittsburg, Kansas
Education in Pittsburg, Kansas
National Register of Historic Places in Crawford County, Kansas